The rock earthcreeper (Ochetorhynchus andaecola) is a species of bird in the family Furnariidae. It is found in the Puna grassland of Bolivia and northern Chile and Argentina. Its natural habitats are subtropical or tropical high-altitude shrubland and subtropical or tropical high-altitude grassland.

Description
The upper parts are brown with some rufous colour on the primary feathers and a rufous brown tail, which is often kept cocked. The underparts are pale buff, with brownish streaks on the sides and flanks, and sometimes on the entire breast. The beak is long and slightly decurved, and there is a narrow buff supercilium above the eye.

Distribution and habitat
The rock earthcreeper is native to the eastern foothills of the Andes Mountains, its range extending from La Paz Department in western Bolivia to northern Argentina and the eastern fringes of Chile.

Ecology
This species usually occurs singly or in pairs. It forages on the ground, seldom far from rocks, hopping along, and probing gravel and loose soil with its beak. It is often wary and difficult to approach, flying off for considerable distances when disturbed. The song is produced from a perch on a bush or boulder, and consists of a series of loud, shrill notes "vee-vee-vee-vee-vi-veet", sometimes ending with a splutter.

Status
The rock earthcreeper has a very wide range in Bolivia, northern Chile and northwestern Argentina. It is an uncommon bird and the populations seems to be declining, but not at such a fast rate as to make it vulnerable. The International Union for Conservation of Nature has assessed its conservation status as being of least concern.

References

 SACC (2007). Reinstate Ochetorhynchus and merge Chilia and Eremobius into it. Accessed 2008-10-28.

rock earthcreeper
Birds of the Puna grassland
rock earthcreeper
Taxonomy articles created by Polbot